James M. Parsons (October 16, 1858 – December 16, 1937) was a justice of the Iowa Supreme Court from January 1, 1935, to December 16, 1937, appointed from Polk County, Iowa.

References

External links

Justices of the Iowa Supreme Court
1858 births
1937 deaths